Lyman Mountain is a summit in the U.S. state of Oregon.

Lyman Mountain was named in 1894 after George S. Lyman, owner of a local apple orchard.

References

Mountains of Jackson County, Oregon
Mountains of Oregon